ABC are an English pop band formed in Sheffield in 1980. Their classic line-up consisted of lead vocalist Martin Fry, guitarist and keyboardist Mark White, saxophonist Stephen Singleton, and drummer David Palmer.

Developed from an earlier band, Vice Versa, ABC achieved ten UK and five US top 40 hit singles between 1981 and 1990, and their 1982 debut studio album, The Lexicon of Love, was a UK number one. Their early-1980s success in the US saw them associated with the Second British Invasion. Now essentially a solo project for Fry, ABC continues to tour and released a ninth studio album, The Lexicon of Love II, in 2016.

History

Formation
ABC has its roots in Vice Versa, a Sheffield band formed in 1977 by synthesizer players Stephen Singleton and Mark White. Their debut gig was as the support to Wire at the Outlook club in Sheffield. They founded their own label, Neutron Records, releasing the EP Music 4. Martin Fry, who wrote the fanzine Modern Drugs, interviewed Vice Versa and shortly afterwards they asked him to join as synthesizer player. Fry accepted and by late 1980 the band had evolved into ABC, with Fry becoming lead singer. The band's last day as Vice Versa was at the Futurama 2 Festival in Leeds in September 1980; from then on it performed as ABC, with Singleton playing saxophone and White on guitar and keyboards. In the new year, Singleton and White were joined by Mark Lickley on bass and David Robinson on drums.

The Lexicon of Love, Beauty Stab & How to Be a Zillionaire: 1981–1985 
The band's first single, "Tears Are Not Enough", made the UK top 20 in 1981. Soon afterwards, Robinson left the band and was replaced by David Palmer; Lickley departed shortly thereafter and was not replaced. In 1982, the band released their debut studio album The Lexicon of Love, which reached number one on the UK Albums Chart. Produced by Trevor Horn, it often featured in UK critics' lists of favourite albums: it ranked 42nd in The Observer Music Monthlys "Top 100 British Albums" (June 2004) and 40th in Q magazine's "100 Greatest British Albums" (June 2000). The band had three top 10 hits during 1982: the singles "Poison Arrow", "The Look of Love" (both of which were recorded whilst Mark Lickley was still a member of the band), and "All of My Heart". Several high-concept music videos were made, including the long-form spy pastiche "Mantrap" by Julien Temple.

Following the culmination of the Lexicon of Love tour, Palmer joined the Yellow Magic Orchestra for a series of tour dates; shortly thereafter Fry, White and Singleton decided to reconvene in order to commence work on their next album, leading Palmer to depart ABC in order to honour his commitments to Yellow Magic Orchestra's tour. The remaining members found it difficult to follow-up on the success of their debut. Their second album, Beauty Stab, was released in November 1983, produced by Gary Langan who was the engineer on The Lexicon of Love. It performed poorly in comparison to its predecessor, peaking at No. 12. The first single from the album, "That Was Then but This Is Now", briefly appeared in the UK top 20, followed by a top 40 showing for "SOS". The band eschewed remixes for the project and so the 12" single for "That Was Then but This Is Now" featured the disclaimer "This record is exactly the same as the 7" version. The choice is yours."

Singleton left the band shortly after the release of Beauty Stab as a result of Fry and White's reluctance to spend much time touring the band's material. Fry and White then enlisted the services of Fiona Russell Powell (under the name "Eden") and David Yarritu in the band's new line-up. Russell Powell had been a member of the original line-up of the pre-ABC band, Vice Versa. According to an article published on 7 March 1997, she 'chickened out' of Vice Versa's first live gig, and the job as frontman went to Fry. The Fry-White-Russell Powell-Yarritu line-up recorded the album How to Be a ... Zillionaire!, released in 1985. The band's chart success dwindled further in the UK with this album, but they did score their first US top 10 hit with "Be Near Me", which also made the UK top 30. The album also featured the singles "(How to Be a) Millionaire", "Vanity Kills" and "Ocean Blue". Inspiration for the album's cartoons of the band members was taken from a photo shoot by David Levine whose work featured on many of the sleeves for singles released from this album. Keith LeBlanc from Tackhead programmed much of the beatbox work for the album.

 Chart success continues with Alphabet City: 1986–1988 
After a hiatus, during which Fry was being treated for Hodgkin's lymphoma, he and White reconvened ABC as a duo, releasing the album Alphabet City in 1987. The album returned them to the UK Top 10 for the first time in five years, peaking at No. 7. It featured "When Smokey Sings", a tribute to Smokey Robinson, which narrowly missed the UK Top 10. The song did give the group their biggest hit in the US, where it peaked at number 5 in September. The album also spawned "The Night You Murdered Love" (UK No. 31) and "King Without a Crown" (UK No. 44) as singles.

 Up, greatest hits album Absolutely & Abracadabra: 1989–1992 
In 1989, the duo issued Up, their fifth and final PolyGram studio album. This time experimenting with house music, ABC scored a minor UK hit with the single "One Better World". A second single, "The Real Thing", and the album itself were less successful. During this period, the duo worked on a couple of outside productions aimed at the house music scene. One was Paul Rutherford's (Frankie Goes to Hollywood) solo album and first single release; the other was for Lizzie Tear on the duo's own Neutron label.

In 1990, the band released a greatest hits compilation album, Absolutely. This covered all of ABC's albums up until 1990 and featured most of their singles. The compilation made the UK Top 10. A video package featuring promos was also released. One new song, "The Look of Love '90", was released to promote the package.

The duo moved to the EMI label (and MCA in North America), where they recorded the 1991 album Abracadabra. Two singles, "Love Conquers All" and "Say It", narrowly missed the UK Top 40, though a remix of the latter by the Italian production team Black Box appeared on the US dance charts.

Martin Fry also collaborated with M People in 1991 on their first album, Northern Soul, recording vocals for the song "Life". However, when the album was re-released in 1992, and again in 1995, this track was omitted.

Skyscraping and comeback: 1997–2007
After a six-year hiatus, Fry, now the sole member of ABC, resurrected the band's name in 1997 for the album Skyscraping, an homage to several of his musical heroes, including David Bowie, Roxy Music and the Sex Pistols. With Glenn Gregory of Heaven 17 and Keith Lowndes contributing to the sessions and songwriting, the album was commercially unsuccessful though a single, "Stranger Things", reached No. 57 in the UK. Two other singles, "Rolling Sevens" and "Skyscraping", did not chart.

In 1999, ABC released their first live album, The Lexicon of Live. The album covered most of their major hits. Although Fry was the only member left, he had a backing band and adorned the album cover in his famed gold lamé suit.

Look of Love – The Very Best of ABC was released in 2001. Although essentially a reissue of the 1990 greatest hits compilation Absolutely, the album featured two new songs by Fry, "Peace and Tranquility" and "Blame". A companion DVD, along with a bonus disc of remixes, was also released.

In 2004, the VH1 show Bands Reunited attempted to get the band's classic line-up of Fry, White, Singleton and Palmer together for a reunion concert. Fry and Palmer appeared and played together (with help from Nick Beggs of Kajagoogoo) for the first time in over twenty years. Singleton and White opted not to participate.

Traffic: 2007–2015
Following a tour of the United States in May and June 2006, Fry and Palmer, together with session keyboardist Chuck Kentis, put together a new ABC album, Traffic. It was released on 28 April 2008. Gary Langan, who worked on The Lexicon of Love and Beauty Stab, mixed and produced the album. The first single, "The Very First Time", debuted on BBC Radio 2 in January, was added to the station's "A" playlist for the week beginning 29 March and was released as a music download track on 1 April.

On 1 September 2007, ABC performed a set with other 1980s acts at Retrofest at Culzean Castle in Ayrshire, Scotland. This appearance included a rendition of "Addicted to Love", with Tony Hadley of Spandau Ballet and Peter Cox of Go West.

In the summer of 2008, ABC toured the US as part of the 2008 Regeneration Tour, which also featured the Human League, Belinda Carlisle, A Flock of Seagulls and Naked Eyes.

In April 2009, ABC performed The Lexicon of Love album live at the Royal Albert Hall, accompanied by the BBC Concert Orchestra. Anne Dudley of Art of Noise, who arranged and played keyboards on the original record, conducted the performance. A music review in the 13 April 2009 edition of The Independent newspaper, described the performance as a "glorious night that has placed one of the Eighties' most perfectly constructed albums back near the top of the pop pantheon".

In 2009 ABC toured the US as the headliner of the 2009 'Regeneration Tour', which also featured Terri Nunn of Berlin, Wang Chung and Cutting Crew.

In June, July and August 2011, ABC performed at a few locations around the UK as well as Las Vegas, Nevada. In October 2011, ABC performing dates in Melbourne, Australia.

On 19 July 2012, Fry was made an honorary Doctor of Music at the University of Sheffield for his contribution to music over more than thirty years. The following day his daughter Nancy received her degree from the Department of Sociological Studies from the same university.

On 1 March 2013, ABC appeared in Dubai, UAE, in the '80s Rewind' concert with Rick Astley, Heaven 17, Howard Jones and T'Pau.

In June 2014, it was revealed that a dozen early tapes had been discovered of rare remixes and unheard songs from ABC's first three albums. These were returned to Martin Fry who was delighted, but unsure as to what he would do with them. According to Classic Pop, the rediscovered songs include "a 'That's It Folks!' mix of 'So Hip It Hurts' from Zillionaire. From Beauty Stab, reams of early studio takes have come to light including one song, 'You and Me', that never made the final album. From The Lexicon of Love era, the band's own, pre-Trevor Horn demos of 'All of My Heart' have come to light, along with a reel entitled '4 Ever 2 Gether – The Outtake, Starring Martin Fry as Ken Dodd'".

The Lexicon of Love II: 2016 and beyond

In October 2015, Fry announced that he was working on a new ABC album. "It's going to be a take on The Lexicon of Love, but all these years on. I'm a man in my fifties now with a wealth of experience. It's about how you grow older but you make the same mistakes over and over and over again."

In November 2015, a compilation album entitled 80s Recovered was released, featuring many artists from the 1980s. ABC contributed a cover of Radiohead's "High and Dry", with a regular version and a remix.

In January 2016, Fry said the new ABC album would be entitled The Lexicon of a Lost Ideal and released in the UK in May 2016. Featuring tracks penned by Fry, with contributions by Rob Fusari, Marcus Vere, Matt Rowe and Anne Dudley, the album features orchestration arranged by Anne Dudley, who worked in a similar capacity on The Lexicon of Love. In April 2016, the release of the new album, now entitled The Lexicon of Love II, was announced with lead single "Viva Love" made available via digital platforms. It was A playlisted by BBC Radio 2. The album was released in the UK and the US on 27 May 2016 and entered the UK Albums Chart at No. 5, the first time ABC had reached the Top 5 since the original Lexicon of Love album in 1982.

ABC also contributed a new song called "Living Inside My Heart" to Fly: Songs Inspired by the Film Eddie the Eagle, the soundtrack of which was released on 18 March 2016 on CD and digitally.

ABC released their first Christmas song, entitled "A Christmas We Deserve", on 2 December 2016 as part of a 4-track EP. The other three songs are acoustic versions of "The Love Inside the Love, "Viva Love" and "The Look of Love".

In March 2017, just before the band's Royal Albert Hall orchestra show on April 6 (featuring songs from The Lexicon of Love II, greatest hits and the complete Lexicon of Love album) the band announced the November 2017 XYZ tour.

In January 2023, a US show was announced: the band will play at the Cruel World Festival in Pasadena, California on May 20, 2023.

Band members

Current members
Martin Fry – lead vocals (1980–1991, 1997–present); keyboards, synthesizers (2016–present); bass guitar (2016–present); guitar (2016–present); drums, percussion (2016–present); alto and tenor saxophones (2016–present)Former membersStephen Singleton – alto and tenor saxophones (1980–1984)
Mark White – keyboards, guitars (1980–1991)
Mark Lickley – bass guitar (1981–1982)
David Robinson – drums, percussion (1981)
David Palmer – drums, percussion (1981–1983, 2004–2009)
Fiona Russell Powell – vocals (1984–1985)
David Yarritu – vocals (1984–1985)Current touring musicians'''
Matt Backer – guitars (1999–present)
Andy Carr – bass guitar (2008–present)
Rob Hughes – alto and tenor saxophones (2008–present)
Steve Kelly – keyboards (1998–present)
Lily Gonzalez – percussion (1998–present) 
Richard Brook – drums, percussion (2009–present)

Line-ups

 Timeline 

 Discography 

 The Lexicon of Love (1982)
 Beauty Stab (1983)
 How to Be a ... Zillionaire! (1985)
 Alphabet City (1987)
 Up (1989)
 Abracadabra (1991)
 Skyscraping (1997)
 Traffic (2008)
 The Lexicon of Love II (2016)

Pop culture influence
 
The track "So Hip It Hurts" from How to Be a ... Zillionaire! featured in the 1986 film Tough Guys.
ABC had three number-one hits on the US Dance Club Songs: "The Look of Love" (18 December 1982), "Be Near Me" (28 September – 5 October 1984) and "When Smokey Sings" / "Chicago" (29 August – 5 September 1987).
ABC was profiled in a 2004 documentary about bands hailing from Sheffield in the late 1970s-to-early 1980s. Original ABC saxophonist, Stephen Singleton, was interviewed for Made in Sheffield'', along with members of the Human League and Heaven 17.

See also
 Honeyroot
 List of Billboard number-one dance club songs
 List of artists who reached number one on the U.S. Dance Club Songs chart
 List of synth-pop artists

References

External links
 
 
 
 

 
English new wave musical groups
English synth-pop groups
Sophisti-pop musical groups
British synth-pop new wave groups
Musical groups from Sheffield
Musical groups established in 1980
Musical groups disestablished in 1991
Musical groups reestablished in 1997
ZTT Records
Parlophone artists
Second British Invasion artists